Lance Blomgren (born 1970) is a Canadian writer who is known for his published fiction and essays.

He grew up in Courtenay, British Columbia and spent various years living and writing in Victoria, British Columbia, Montreal, Quebec, Las Cruces, New Mexico and Vancouver, British Columbia.

He completed degrees from the University of Victoria in Victoria, British Columbia, and Concordia University in Montreal, Quebec.

Apart from his books, Blomgren's writing has appeared frequently in Matrix magazine (Montreal), ascent magazine (Montreal), Geist, (Vancouver) and Visual Codec (Seattle).

In 1998, his publication, Liner won the Canadian bpNichol Award. In 2004, his collection Corner Pieces was nominated for the Canadian ReLit Award.

He is also noted as a curator and critic of contemporary visual art, having curated for the Rad'a gallery in Montreal, the Helen Pitt Gallery in Vancouver and the Klondike Institute of Art and Culture in Dawson City, Yukon, and having published writing about art in various journals and publications internationally including, Art Asia Pacific (New York), Fillip (Vancouver, British Columbia) and Informal Architectures (London, United Kingdom, Black Dog Publishing).

Books

Practice, Intrepid Tourist Press, Union Bay, British Columbia, 1995.

Manual for Beginners, (co-authored) Intrepid Tourist Press, Oakville, Ontario, 1996.

Liner, ITP Books, Union Bay, British Columbia, 1998.

Walkups, conundrum press, Montreal, Quebec, 2000.

Oasis, Saidye Bronfman Centre for the Arts, Montreal, Quebec, 2001.

Corner Pieces, conundrum press, Montreal Quebec, 2004.

Walkups: Scènes de la vie Montréalaise, Editions Adage, Montreal, Quebec / Editions Maelstrom, Brussels, Belgium, 2007.

Further reading
 Artspeak exhibition catalogue 
 Doppelganger.com

External links

 Author info at QWF Database 
 Author info at ABC Bookworld

Canadian male short story writers
Writers from British Columbia
People from Courtenay, British Columbia
Living people
1970 births
University of Victoria alumni
Concordia University alumni
20th-century Canadian short story writers
21st-century Canadian short story writers
Canadian male essayists
20th-century Canadian essayists
21st-century Canadian essayists
20th-century Canadian male writers
21st-century Canadian male writers